Natasha Perdue (born 27 July 1975) is a British weightlifter who competed for Great Britain at the 2012 Olympic Games in London.  Perdue's father Terry Perdue was also a weightlifter and competed at the 1968 and 1972 Olympics.

References

Welsh female weightlifters
Olympic weightlifters of Great Britain
Commonwealth Games competitors for Wales
Sportspeople from Swansea
1975 births
Living people
Weightlifters at the 2012 Summer Olympics
Weightlifters at the 2014 Commonwealth Games